The Valiant Navigator or The Brave Seafarer (German: Der mutige Seefahrer) is a 1935 German comedy film directed by Hans Deppe and starring Paul Kemp, Lucie Englisch and Maria Krahn.

It was based on a play by Georg Kaiser which was later adapted into the 1940 American film The Ghost Comes Home.

Synopsis
A young man plans to emigrate to the United States with his fiancée but becomes extremely fearful about the ocean crossing due to a local superstition. Eventually he decides to stay at home and marry his girl.

Cast
 Paul Kemp as Berthold Jebs  
 Lucie Englisch as Grete Holm  
 Maria Krahn as Paula Jebs  
 Harald Paulsen as Otto Jebs  
 Otto Wernicke as Bäckermeister Holm  
 Carsta Löck as Tine Peterson  
 Harry Frank as Joe Jefferson  
 Paul Westermeier as Timm, ein Landstreicher  
 Hans Mierendorff as Jan, ein Matrose 
 Paul Beckers 
 Elli Blank 
 Rudolf Essek 
 Karl Harbacher 
 Oskar Höcker 
 Werner Pledath 
 Arthur Reppert 
 Ernst Rückert
 Otto Sauter-Sarto 
 Willi Schaeffers 
 Hans Hermann Schaufuß 
 Toni Tetzlaff 
 Petra Unkel

References

Bibliography
 Waldman, Harry. Nazi Films in America, 1933-1942. McFarland, 2008.

External links 
 

1935 films
1935 comedy films
German comedy films
Films of Nazi Germany
1930s German-language films
Films directed by Hans Deppe
Films based on works by Georg Kaiser
German films based on plays
Tobis Film films
German black-and-white films
1930s German films